Palacios Independent School District is a public school district based in Palacios, Texas (USA). The district is located south of Bay City, Texas.

Located in southwestern Matagorda County, a small portion of the district extends into southeastern Jackson County. The district serves Palacios and several unincorporated areas, including Collegeport in Matagorda County.

PISD's rival is Tidehaven Independent School District.

In 2009, the school district was rated "recognized" by the Texas Education Agency.

Schools
Palacios High School (Grades 9-12)
Palacios High School has been awarded the bronze medal by US News's America's Best High Schools, US News.
Palacios Junior High (Grades 6-8)
East Side Intermediate (Grades 4-5)
2008-2010 Exemplary Campus 
1989-90 National Blue Ribbon School
Central Elementary (Grades PK-3)

References

External links
 

School districts in Matagorda County, Texas
School districts in Jackson County, Texas